Robert Allan Lewis (born 7 October 1942) is a former  international rugby union player.

He was capped six times by Wales as a scrum-half between 1966 and 1967.

He was selected for the 1966 British Lions tour to Australia and New Zealand, and played in the last three internationals against the All Blacks. He also toured South Africa with Wales in 1964.

He played club rugby for Abertillery and Newport.

References

1942 births
Living people
Abertillery RFC players
Blaenavon RFC players
British & Irish Lions rugby union players from Wales
Newport RFC players
Rugby union players from Blaenavon
Rugby union scrum-halves
Wales international rugby union players
Welsh rugby union players